Ryder Michael Ryan (born May 11, 1995) is an American professional baseball pitcher in the Seattle Mariners organization.

Amateur career
Ryan attended North Mecklenburg High School in Huntersville, North Carolina, where he played baseball for his father, Sean. As a junior in 2013, he hit .597 with 29 RBIs along with pitching to a 0.28 ERA in 54.2 innings. He committed to play college baseball at the University of North Carolina for the North Carolina Tar Heels the summer before his senior year. As a senior, he batted .536 with six home runs and 28 RBIs while also pitching to a 7–1 record and a 0.57 ERA. Although he was projected to be drafted as high as the third round in the 2014 Major League Baseball draft, he was not drafted until the 40th round by the Cleveland Indians. He did not sign and instead enrolled at North Carolina.

In his freshman and sophomore years at North Carolina, Ryan appeared in only 33 games as a hitter, and only one game as a pitcher. After his sophomore year, he was drafted once again by the Indians, this time as a pitcher, in the 30th round of the 2016 Major League Baseball draft. He chose to sign with Cleveland rather than return to school.

Professional career

Cleveland Indians organization
After signing, Ryan made his professional debut with the Arizona League Indians where he was 0–1 with a 3.86 ERA in  relief innings pitched. He began 2017 with the Lake County Captains, where he was named a Midwest League All-Star after compiling a 0.84 ERA in  innings pitched.

New York Mets organization
On August 9, 2017, Ryan was traded to the New York Mets in exchange for Jay Bruce. He finished the year with the Columbia Fireflies. In 41 relief appearances between Lake County and Columbia, he was 3–4 with a 4.14 ERA. In 2018, he began the season with the St. Lucie Mets, where he was named a Florida State League All-Star after posting a 1–0 record, a 1.77 ERA, and a 0.93 WHIP over 16 relief appearances. He was promoted to the Binghamton Rumble Ponies in late May. Over 42 relief appearances between St. Lucie and Binghamton, he went 4–3 with a 3.23 ERA and a 1.06 WHIP. Ryan returned to Binghamton in 2019, going 3–1 with a 3.05 ERA over  innings, striking out forty. He did not play a minor league game in 2020 due to the cancellation of the minor league season caused by the COVID-19 pandemic.

Texas Rangers organization
On December 18, 2020, Ryan was traded to the Texas Rangers as the PTBNL in the Todd Frazier trade of August 31, 2020. For the 2021 season, he was assigned to the Round Rock Express with whom he went 2-7 with a 5.60 ERA and 55 strikeouts over 45 innings pitched in relief. He opened the 2022 season back with Round Rock.

Seattle Mariners organization
On December 19, 2022, Ryan signed a minor league contract with the Seattle Mariners.

International career
On July 2, 2021, Ryan was named to the roster for the United States national baseball team for the 2020 Summer Olympics, contested in 2021 in Tokyo. The team went on to win silver, falling to Japan in the gold-medal game.

Personal life
Ryan and his wife, Brynn, have one son together. Ryan's younger brother, River, plays in the Los Angeles Dodgers organization.

References

External links

1995 births
Living people
People from Huntersville, North Carolina
Baseball players at the 2020 Summer Olympics
Baseball players from North Carolina
Baseball pitchers
North Carolina Tar Heels baseball players
Arizona League Indians players
Lake County Captains players
Columbia Fireflies players
St. Lucie Mets players
Binghamton Rumble Ponies players
Round Rock Express players
United States national baseball team players
Olympic baseball players of the United States
Medalists at the 2020 Summer Olympics
Olympic silver medalists for the United States in baseball